A forpet, lippie or lippy was a Scottish unit of dry measure equal to a quarter or fourth-part of a peck.  

A lippie was so called because a leap was a traditional name for a basket in Scotland.

See also 
 Firlot

References

Units of volume
Obsolete Scottish units of measurement